The Australia national under-21 speedway team is the national under-21 motorcycle speedway team of Australia and is controlled by the Motorcycling Australia. Like the senior Australian team, the Under-21s are managed by former rider Mark Lemon.

The team has qualified to the Under-21 World Cup Final on four occasions, though they only raced in the Final three of those times. These came in 2008 when they finished fourth, 2011 when they won their Semi-final but were forced to withdraw due to travel cost and visa problems, 2012 when the team finished in second place, and again in 2013 when they finished fourth.

The Australian team was guaranteed a place in the 2015 World Championship Final due to it being held at the Olympic Park Speedway in Mildura on 31 October. It was the first time that the Under-21 Team Championship Final was held outside of Europe or the UK and was held just one week after the 2015 Speedway Grand Prix of Australia was run in the Victorian state capital Melbourne. The Aussie's finished third on the night behind winners Poland and runner-up Denmark.

Australia has produced four Under-21 World Champions: Leigh Adams (1992), Jason Crump (1995), Darcy Ward (2009 and 2010) and Max Fricke (2016). In 1983, Steve Baker won the European Under-21 Championship open for riders from all continents. The European Championship was renamed as the World Championship in 1988.

Crump would go on to win the Speedway World Championship in 2004, 2006 and 2009. Adams has won a record 10 Australian Championships and jointly holds the record for Australian Under-21 Championships with four wins with 2012 World Champion Chris Holder, while Ward is also a triple Australian Under-21 Champion. Baker won the South Australian Championship in 1985 and second in the Australian Championship in 1987.

The current Australian Under-21 team (at the 2016 World Championship Final) was reigning Australian champion Brady Kurtz (c), triple Australian Under-21 champion Max Fricke, Jack Holder, Jake Allen and reserve Cameron Heeps. The team finished in second place on 37 points in Norrköping, Sweden behind winners Poland who scored 44 points. Denmark and host nation Sweden finished in 3rd and 4th places respectively.

Competition 

* Due to cost of travel and visa problems, Australia withdrew from the 2011 Final,

Honours

Individual Under-21 World Championship
 1983* -  Lonigo, Pista Speedway - Steve Baker 13pts
 1992 -  Pfaffenhofen an der Ilm, Speedway Stadion Pfaffenhofen - Leigh Adams 14+3pts
 1995 -  Tampere, Ratinan Stadion - Jason Crump 13+3pts
 2009 -  Goričan, Stadium Milenium - Darcy Ward 13pts
 2010 -  Gdańsk,  Daugavpils,  Pardubice - Darcy Ward 30+3pts
 2016 -  King's Lynn,  Pardubice,  Gdańsk - Max Fricke 46pts
* Steve Baker's win in 1983 was when it was known as the European Under-21 Championship

See also 
 Australia national speedway team
 Australian Under-21 Championship

References

External links 
 MA webside

National speedway teams
Speedway
Team